Polish (Polish: język polski, polszczyzna  or simply polski) is a West Slavic language of the Lechitic group written in the Latin script. It is spoken primarily in Poland and serves as the native language of the Poles. In addition to being the official language of Poland, it is also used by the Polish diaspora. There are over 50 million Polish speakers around the world. It ranks as the sixth most-spoken among languages of the European Union. Polish is subdivided into regional dialects and maintains strict T–V distinction pronouns, honorifics, and various forms of formalities when addressing individuals.

The traditional 32-letter Polish alphabet has nine additions (ą, ć, ę, ł, ń, ó, ś, ź, ż) to the letters of the basic 26-letter Latin alphabet, while removing three (x, q, v). Those three letters are at times included in an extended 35-letter alphabet, although they are not used in native words. The traditional set comprises 23 consonants and 9 written vowels, including two nasal vowels (ę, ą) defined by a reversed diacritic hook called an ogonek. Polish is a synthetic and fusional language which has seven grammatical cases. It is one of very few languages in the world possessing continuous penultimate stress (with only a few exceptions) and the only in its group having an abundance of palatal consonants. Contemporary Polish developed in the 1700s as the successor to the medieval Old Polish (10th–16th centuries) and Middle Polish (16th–18th centuries).

Among the major languages, it is most closely related to Slovak and Czech but differs in terms of pronunciation and general grammar. In addition, Polish was profoundly influenced by Latin and other Romance languages like Italian and French as well as Germanic languages (most notably German), which contributed to a large number of loanwords and similar grammatical structures. Extensive usage of nonstandard dialects has also shaped the standard language; considerable colloquialisms and expressions were directly borrowed from German or Yiddish and subsequently adopted into the vernacular of Polish which is in everyday use.

Historically, Polish was a lingua franca, important both diplomatically and academically in Central and part of Eastern Europe. Today, Polish is spoken by approximately 38 million people as their first language in Poland. It is also spoken as a second language in eastern Germany, northern Czech Republic and Slovakia, western parts of Belarus and Ukraine as well as in southeast Lithuania and Latvia. Because of the emigration from Poland during different time periods, most notably after World War II, millions of Polish speakers can also be found in countries such as Canada, Argentina, Brazil, Israel, Australia, the United Kingdom and the United States.

History

Polish began to emerge as a distinct language around the 10th century, the process largely triggered by the establishment and development of the Polish state. Mieszko I, ruler of the Polans tribe from the Greater Poland region, united a few culturally and linguistically related tribes from the basins of the Vistula and Oder before eventually accepting baptism in 966. With Christianity, Poland also adopted the Latin alphabet, which made it possible to write down Polish, which until then had existed only as a spoken language. The closest relatives of Polish are the Elbe and Baltic Sea Lechitic dialects (Polabian and Pomeranian varieties). All of them, except Kashubian, are extinct. The precursor to modern Polish is the Old Polish language. Ultimately, Polish descends from the unattested Proto-Slavic language.

The Book of Henryków (Polish:), contains the earliest known sentence written in the Polish language: Day, ut ia pobrusa, a ti poziwai (in modern orthography: Daj, uć ja pobrusza, a ti pocziwaj; the corresponding sentence in modern Polish: Daj, niech ja pomielę, a ty odpoczywaj or Pozwól, że ja będę mełł, a ty odpocznij; and in English: Come, let me grind, and you take a rest), written around 1270.

The medieval recorder of this phrase, the Cistercian monk Peter of the Henryków monastery, noted that "Hoc est in polonico" ("This is in Polish").

The earliest treatise on Polish orthography was written by  around 1470. The first book in Polish was printed in either 1508 or 1513, while the first Polish newspaper Merkuriusz Polski Ordynaryjny appeared in 1661. Starting in the 1520s, large numbers of books in the Polish language were published, contributing to increased homogeneity of grammar and orthography. The writing system achieved its overall form in the 16th century, which is also regarded as the Golden Age of Polish literature. The orthography was modified in the 19th century and in 1936.

Tomasz Kamusella notes that "Polish is the oldest, non-ecclesiastical, written Slavic language with a continuous tradition of literacy and official use, which has lasted unbroken from the 16th century to this day." Polish evolved into the main sociolect of the nobles in Poland–Lithuania in the 15th century. The history of Polish as a language of state governance begins in the 16th century in the Kingdom of Poland. Over the later centuries, Polish served as the official language in the Grand Duchy of Lithuania, Congress Poland, the Kingdom of Galicia and Lodomeria, and as the administrative language in the Russian Empire's Western Krai. The growth of the Polish–Lithuanian Commonwealth's influence gave Polish the status of lingua franca in Central and Eastern Europe.

Geographic distribution

Poland is one of the most linguistically homogeneous European countries; nearly 97% of Poland's citizens declare Polish as their first language. Elsewhere, Poles constitute large minorities in areas which were once administered or occupied by Poland, notably in neighboring Lithuania, Belarus, and Ukraine. Polish is the most widely-used minority language in Lithuania's Vilnius County, by 26% of the population, according to the 2001 census results, as Vilnius was part of Poland from 1922 until 1939. Polish is found elsewhere in southeastern Lithuania. In Ukraine, it is most common in the western parts of Lviv and Volyn Oblasts, while in West Belarus it is used by the significant Polish minority, especially in the Brest and Grodno regions and in areas along the Lithuanian border. There are significant numbers of Polish speakers among Polish emigrants and their descendants in many other countries.

In the United States, Polish Americans number more than 11 million but most of them cannot speak Polish fluently. According to the 2000 United States Census, 667,414  Americans of age five years and over reported Polish as the language spoken at home, which is about 1.4% of people who speak languages other than English, 0.25% of the US population, and 6% of the Polish-American population. The largest concentrations of Polish speakers reported in the census (over 50%) were found in three states: Illinois (185,749),  (111,740), and New Jersey (74,663). Enough people in these areas speak Polish that PNC Financial Services (which has a large number of branches in all of these areas) offers services available in Polish at all of their cash machines in addition to English and Spanish.

According to the 2011 census there are now over 500,000 people in England and Wales who consider Polish to be their "main" language. In Canada, there is a significant Polish Canadian population: There are 242,885 speakers of Polish according to the 2006 census, with a particular concentration in Toronto (91,810 speakers) and Montreal.

The geographical distribution of the Polish language was greatly affected by the territorial changes of Poland immediately after World War II and Polish population transfers (1944–46). Poles settled in the "Recovered Territories" in the west and north, which had previously been mostly German-speaking. Some Poles remained in the previously Polish-ruled territories in the east that were annexed by the USSR, resulting in the present-day Polish-speaking minorities in Lithuania, Belarus, and Ukraine, although many Poles were expelled or emigrated from those areas to areas within Poland's new borders. To the east of Poland, the most significant Polish minority lives in a long, narrow strip along either side of the Lithuania-Belarus border. Meanwhile, the flight and expulsion of Germans (1944–50), as well as the expulsion of Ukrainians and Operation Vistula, the 1947 forced resettlement of Ukrainian minorities to the Recovered Territories in the west of the country, contributed to the country's linguistic homogeneity.

Dialects

The inhabitants of different regions of Poland  speak Polish somewhat differently, although the differences between modern-day vernacular varieties and standard Polish appear relatively slight. Most of the middle aged and young speak vernaculars close to standard Polish, while the traditional dialects are preserved among older people in rural areas. First-language speakers of Polish have no trouble understanding each other, and non-native speakers may have difficulty recognizing the regional and social differences. The modern standard dialect, often termed as "correct Polish", is spoken or at least understood throughout the entire country.

Polish has traditionally been described as consisting of four or five main regional dialects:
 Greater Polish, spoken in the west
 Lesser Polish, spoken in the south and southeast
 Masovian, spoken throughout the central and eastern parts of the country
 Silesian, spoken in the southwest (also considered a separate language, see comment below)

Kashubian, spoken in Pomerania west of Gdańsk on the Baltic Sea, is thought of either as a fifth Polish dialect or a distinct language, depending on the criteria used. It contains a number of features not found elsewhere in Poland, e.g. nine distinct oral vowels (vs. the five of standard Polish) and (in the northern dialects) phonemic word stress, an archaic feature preserved from Common Slavic times and not found anywhere else among the West Slavic languages. However, it "lacks most of the linguistic and social determinants of language-hood".

Many linguistic sources categorize Silesian as a dialect of Polish. However, many Silesians consider themselves a separate ethnicity and have been advocating for the recognition of a Silesian language. According to the last official census in Poland in 2011, over half a million people declared Silesian as their native language. Many sociolinguists (e.g. Tomasz Kamusella, Agnieszka Pianka, Alfred F. Majewicz, Tomasz Wicherkiewicz) assume that extralinguistic criteria decide whether a lect is an independent language or a dialect: speakers of the speech variety or/and political decisions, and this is dynamic (i.e. it changes over time). Also, research organizations such as SIL International and resources for the academic field of linguistics such as Ethnologue, Linguist List and others, for example the Ministry of Administration and Digitization recognized the Silesian language. In July 2007, the Silesian language was recognized by ISO, and was attributed an ISO code of szl.

Some additional characteristic but less widespread regional dialects include:
 The distinctive dialect of the Gorals (Góralski) occurs in the mountainous area bordering the Czech Republic and Slovakia. The Gorals ("Highlanders") take great pride in their culture and the dialect. It exhibits some cultural influences from the Vlach shepherds who migrated from Wallachia (southern Romania) in the 14th–17th centuries.
 The Poznanski dialect, spoken in Poznań and to some extent in the whole region of the former Prussian Partition (excluding Upper Silesia), with noticeable German influences.
 In the northern and western (formerly German) regions where Poles from the territories annexed by the Soviet Union resettled after World War II, the older generation speaks a dialect of Polish characteristic of the Kresy that includes a longer pronunciation of vowels.
 Poles living in Lithuania (particularly in the Vilnius region), in Belarus (particularly the northwest), and in the northeast of Poland continue to speak the Eastern Borderlands dialect, which sounds "slushed" (in Polish described as zaciąganie z ruska, "speaking with a Ruthenian drawl") and is easily distinguishable.
 Some city dwellers, especially the less affluent population, had their own distinctive dialects – for example, the Warsaw dialect, still spoken by some of the population of Praga on the eastern bank of the Vistula. However, these city dialects are  mostly extinct due to assimilation with standard Polish.
 Many Poles living in emigrant communities (for example, in the United States), whose families left Poland just after World War II, retain a number of minor features of Polish vocabulary as spoken in the first half of the 20th century that now sound archaic to contemporary visitors from Poland.

Polish linguistics has been characterized by a strong strive towards promoting prescriptive ideas of language intervention and usage uniformity, along with normatively-oriented notions of language "correctness" (unusual by Western standards).

Phonology

Vowels
Polish has six oral vowels (seven oral vowels in written form), which are all monophthongs, and two nasal vowels. Unlike Czech or Slovak, Polish does not retain phonemic vowel length — the letter ó, which formerly represented lengthened /ɔ/ in older forms of the language, is now vestigial and instead corresponds to /u/.

Consonants
The Polish consonant system shows more complexity: its characteristic features include the series of affricate and palatal consonants that resulted from four Proto-Slavic palatalizations and two further palatalizations that took place in Polish. The full set of consonants, together with their most common spellings, can be presented as follows (although other phonological analyses exist):

Neutralization occurs between voiced–voiceless consonant pairs in certain environments, at the end of words (where devoicing occurs) and in certain consonant clusters (where assimilation occurs). For details, see Voicing and devoicing in the article on Polish phonology.

Most Polish words are paroxytones (that is, the stress falls on the second-to-last syllable of a polysyllabic word), although there are exceptions.

Consonant distribution
Polish permits complex consonant clusters, which historically often arose from the disappearance of yers. Polish can have word-initial and word-medial clusters of up to four consonants, whereas word-final clusters can have up to five consonants. Examples of such clusters can be found in words such as bezwzględny  ('absolute' or 'heartless', 'ruthless'), źdźbło  ('blade of grass'),   ('shock'), and krnąbrność  ('disobedience').

Unlike languages such as Czech, Polish does not have syllabic consonants – the nucleus of a syllable is always a vowel.

The consonant  is restricted to positions adjacent to a vowel. It also cannot precede the letter y.

Prosody

The predominant stress pattern in Polish is penultimate stress – in a word of more than one syllable, the next-to-last syllable is stressed. Alternating preceding syllables carry secondary stress, e.g. in a four-syllable word, where the primary stress is on the third syllable, there will be secondary stress on the first.

Each vowel represents one syllable, although the letter i normally does not represent a vowel when it precedes another vowel (it represents , palatalization of the preceding consonant, or both depending on analysis). Also the letters u and i sometimes represent only semivowels when they follow another vowel, as in autor  ('author'), mostly in loanwords (so not in native nauka  'science, the act of learning', for example, nor in nativized Mateusz   'Matthew').

Some loanwords, particularly from the classical languages, have the stress on the antepenultimate (third-from-last) syllable. For example, fizyka ('physics') is stressed on the first syllable. This may lead to a rare phenomenon of minimal pairs differing only in stress placement, for example muzyka  'music' vs. muzyka  – genitive singular of muzyk 'musician'. When additional syllables are added to such words through inflection or suffixation, the stress normally becomes regular. For example, uniwersytet ('university') has irregular stress on the third (or antepenultimate) syllable, but the genitive uniwersytetu and derived adjective uniwersytecki have regular stress on the penultimate syllables. Loanwords generally become nativized to have penultimate stress. In psycholinguistic experiments, speakers of Polish have been demonstrated to be sensitive to the distinction between regular penultimate and exceptional antepenultimate stress.

Another class of exceptions is verbs with the conditional endings -by, -bym, -byśmy, etc. These endings are not counted in determining the position of the stress; for example, zrobiłbym ('I would do') is stressed on the first syllable, and zrobilibyśmy ('we would do') on the second. According to prescriptive authorities, the same applies to the first and second person plural past tense endings -śmy, -ście, although this rule is often ignored in colloquial speech (so zrobiliśmy 'we did' should be prescriptively stressed on the second syllable, although in practice it is commonly stressed on the third as zrobiliśmy). These irregular stress patterns are explained by the fact that these endings are detachable clitics rather than true verbal inflections: for example, instead of kogo zobaczyliście? ('whom did you see?') it is possible to say kogoście zobaczyli? – here kogo retains its usual stress (first syllable) in spite of the attachment of the clitic. Reanalysis of the endings as inflections when attached to verbs causes the different colloquial stress patterns. These stress patterns are considered part of a "usable" norm of standard Polish - in contrast to the "model" ("high") norm.

Some common word combinations are stressed as if they were a single word. This applies in particular to many combinations of preposition plus a personal pronoun, such as do niej ('to her'), na nas ('on us'), przeze mnie ('because of me'), all stressed on the bolded syllable.

Orthography

The Polish alphabet derives from the Latin script but includes certain additional letters formed using diacritics. The Polish alphabet was one of three major forms of Latin-based orthography developed for Western and some South Slavic languages, the others being Czech orthography and Croatian orthography, the last of these being a 19th-century invention trying to make a compromise between the first two. Kashubian uses a Polish-based system, Slovak uses a Czech-based system, and Slovene follows the Croatian one; the Sorbian languages blend the Polish and the Czech ones.

Historically, Poland's once diverse and multi-ethnic population utilized many forms of scripture to write Polish. For instance, Lipka Tatars and Muslims inhabiting the eastern parts of the former Polish–Lithuanian Commonwealth wrote Polish in the Arabic alphabet. The Cyrillic script is used to a certain extent by Polish speakers in Western Belarus, especially for religious texts.

The diacritics used in the Polish alphabet are the kreska (graphically similar to the acute accent) over the letters ć, ń, ó, ś, ź and through the letter in ł; the kropka (superior dot) over the letter ż, and the ogonek ("little tail") under the letters ą, ę. The letters q, v, x are used only in foreign words and names.

Polish orthography is largely phonemic—there is a consistent correspondence between letters (or digraphs and trigraphs) and phonemes (for exceptions see below). The letters of the alphabet and their normal phonemic values are listed in the following table.

The following digraphs and trigraphs are used:

Voiced consonant letters frequently come to represent voiceless sounds (as shown in the tables); this occurs at the end of words and in certain clusters, due to the neutralization mentioned in the Phonology section above. Occasionally also voiceless consonant letters can represent voiced sounds in clusters.

For example, the s in siwy ("grey-haired"), the si in siarka ("sulfur") and the ś in  święty ("holy") all represent the sound . The exceptions to the above rule are certain loanwords from Latin, Italian, French, Russian or English—where s before i is pronounced as s, e.g. sinus, sinologia, do re mi fa sol la si do, Saint-Simon i saint-simoniści, Sierioża, Siergiej, Singapur, singiel. In other loanwords the vowel i is changed to y, e.g. Syria, Sybir, synchronizacja, Syrakuzy.

The following table shows the correspondence between the sounds and spelling:

Digraphs and trigraphs are used:

Most Polish speakers, however, do not consider palatalization of k, g, (c)h or l as creating new sounds.

Except in the cases mentioned above, the letter i if followed by another vowel in the same word usually represents , yet a palatalization of the previous consonant is always assumed.

The reverse case, where the consonant remains unpalatalized but is followed by a palatalized consonant, is written by using j instead of i: for example, zjeść, "to eat up".

The letters ą and ę, when followed by plosives and affricates, represent an oral vowel followed by a nasal consonant, rather than a nasal vowel. For example, ą in dąb ("oak") is pronounced , and ę in tęcza ("rainbow") is pronounced  (the nasal assimilates to the following consonant). When followed by l or ł (for example przyjęli, przyjęły),  ę is pronounced as just e. When ę is at the end of the word it is often pronounced as just .

Note that, depending on the word, the phoneme  can be spelt h or ch, the phoneme  can be spelt ż or rz, and  can be spelt u or ó. In several cases it determines the meaning, for example: może ("maybe") and morze ("sea").

In occasional words, letters that normally form a digraph are pronounced separately. For example, rz represents , not , in words like zamarzać ("freeze") and in the name Tarzan.

Doubled letters are usually pronounced as a single, lengthened consonant, however, some speakers might pronounce the combination as two separate sounds.

There are certain clusters where a written consonant would not be pronounced. For example, the ł in the word jabłko ("apple") might be omitted in ordinary speech, leading to the pronunciation japko.

Grammar 

Polish is a highly fusional language with relatively free word order, although the dominant arrangement is subject–verb–object (SVO). There are no articles, and subject pronouns are often dropped.

Nouns belong to one of three genders: masculine, feminine and neuter. The masculine gender is also divided into subgenders : animate vs inanimate in the singular, human vs nonhuman in the plural. There are seven cases: nominative, genitive, dative, accusative, instrumental, locative and vocative.

Adjectives agree with nouns in terms of gender, case, and number. Attributive adjectives most commonly precede the noun, although in certain cases, especially in fixed phrases (like język polski, "Polish (language)"), the noun may come first; the rule of thumb is that generic descriptive adjective normally precedes (e.g. piękny kwiat, "beautiful flower") while categorizing adjective often follows the noun (e.g. węgiel kamienny, "black coal"). Most short adjectives and their derived adverbs form comparatives and superlatives by inflection (the superlative is formed by prefixing naj- to the comparative).

Verbs are of imperfective or perfective aspect, often occurring in pairs. Imperfective verbs have a present tense, past tense, compound future tense (except for być "to be", which has a simple future będę etc., this in turn being used to form the compound future of other verbs), subjunctive/conditional (formed with the detachable particle by), imperatives, an infinitive, present participle, present gerund and past participle. Perfective verbs have a simple future tense (formed like the present tense of imperfective verbs), past tense, subjunctive/conditional, imperatives, infinitive, present gerund and past participle. Conjugated verb forms agree with their subject in terms of person, number, and (in the case of past tense and subjunctive/conditional forms) gender.

Passive-type constructions can be made using the auxiliary być or zostać ("become") with the passive participle. There is also an impersonal construction where the active verb is used (in third person singular) with no subject, but with the reflexive pronoun się present to indicate a general, unspecified subject (as in pije się wódkę "vodka is being drunk"—note that wódka appears in the accusative). A similar sentence type in the past tense uses the passive participle with the ending -o, as in widziano ludzi ("people were seen"). As in other Slavic languages, there are also subjectless sentences formed using such words as można ("it is possible") together with an infinitive.

Yes-no questions (both direct and indirect) are formed by placing the word czy at the start. Negation uses the word nie, before the verb or other item being negated; nie is still added before the verb even if the sentence also contains other negatives such as nigdy ("never") or nic ("nothing"), effectively creating a double negative.

Cardinal numbers have a complex system of inflection and agreement. Zero and cardinal numbers higher than five (except for those ending with the digit 2, 3 or 4 but not ending with 12, 13 or 14) govern the genitive case rather than the nominative or accusative. Special forms of numbers (collective numerals) are used with certain classes of noun, which include dziecko ("child") and exclusively plural nouns such as drzwi ("door").

Borrowed words

Polish has, over the centuries, borrowed a number of words from other languages. When borrowing, pronunciation was adapted to Polish phonemes and spelling was altered to match Polish orthography. In addition, word endings are liberally applied to almost any word to produce verbs, nouns, adjectives, as well as adding the appropriate endings for cases of nouns, adjectives, diminutives, double-diminutives, augmentatives, etc.

Depending on the historical period, borrowing has proceeded from various languages. Notable influences have been Latin (10th–18th centuries), Czech (10th and 14th–15th centuries), Italian (16th–17th centuries), French (17th–19th centuries), German (13–15th and 18th–20th centuries), Hungarian (15th–16th centuries) and Turkish (17th century). Currently, English words are the most common imports to Polish.

The Latin language, for a very long time the only official language of the Polish state, has had a great influence on Polish. Many Polish words were direct borrowings or calques (e.g. rzeczpospolita from res publica) from Latin. Latin was known to a larger or smaller degree by most of the numerous szlachta in the 16th to 18th centuries (and it continued to be extensively taught at secondary schools until World War II). Apart from dozens of loanwords, its influence can also be seen in a number of verbatim Latin phrases in Polish literature (especially from the 19th century and earlier).
During the 12th and 13th centuries, Mongolian words were brought to the Polish language during wars with the armies of Genghis Khan and his descendants, e.g. dzida (spear) and szereg (a line or row).

Words from Czech, an important influence during the 10th and 14th–15th centuries include sejm, hańba and brama.

In 1518, the Polish king Sigismund I the Old married Bona Sforza, the niece of the Holy Roman emperor Maximilian, who introduced Italian cuisine to Poland, especially vegetables. Hence, words from Italian include pomidor from "pomodoro" (tomato), kalafior from "cavolfiore" (cauliflower), and pomarańcza, a portmanteau from Italian "pomo" (pome) plus "arancio" (orange). A later word of Italian origin is autostrada (from Italian "autostrada", highway).

In the 18th century, with the rising prominence of France in Europe, French supplanted Latin as an important source of words. Some French borrowings also date from the Napoleonic era, when the Poles were enthusiastic supporters of Napoleon. Examples include ekran (from French "écran", screen), abażur ("abat-jour", lamp shade), rekin ("requin", shark), meble ("meuble", furniture), bagaż ("bagage", luggage), walizka ("valise", suitcase), fotel ("fauteuil", armchair), plaża ("plage", beach) and koszmar ("cauchemar", nightmare). Some place names have also been adapted from French, such as the Warsaw borough of Żoliborz ("joli bord" = beautiful riverside), as well as the town of Żyrardów (from the name Girard, with the Polish suffix -ów attached to refer to the founder of the town).

Many words were borrowed from the German language from the sizable German population in Polish cities during medieval times. German words found in the Polish language are often connected with trade, the building industry, civic rights and city life. Some words were assimilated verbatim, for example handel (trade) and dach (roof); others are pronounced similarly, but differ in writing Schnur—sznur (cord). As a result of being neighbors with Germany, Polish has many German expressions which have become literally translated (calques). The regional dialects of Upper Silesia and Masuria (Modern Polish East Prussia) have noticeably more German loanwords than other varieties.

The contacts with Ottoman Turkey in the 17th century brought many new words, some of them still in use, such as: jar ("yar" deep valley), szaszłyk ("şişlik" shish kebab), filiżanka ("fincan" cup), arbuz ("karpuz" watermelon), dywan ("divan" carpet), etc.

From the founding of the Kingdom of Poland in 1025 through the early years of the Polish–Lithuanian Commonwealth created in 1569, Poland was the most tolerant country of Jews in Europe. Known as the "paradise for the Jews", it became a shelter for persecuted and expelled European Jewish communities and the home to the world's largest Jewish community of the time. As a result, many Polish words come from Yiddish, spoken by the large Polish Jewish population that existed until the Holocaust. Borrowed Yiddish words include bachor (an unruly boy or child), bajzel (slang for mess), belfer (slang for teacher), ciuchy (slang for clothing), cymes (slang for very tasty food), geszeft (slang for business), kitel (slang for apron), machlojka (slang for scam), mamona (money), manele (slang for oddments), myszygene (slang for lunatic), pinda (slang for girl, pejoratively), plajta (slang for bankruptcy), rejwach (noise), szmal (slang for money), and trefny (dodgy).

The mountain dialects of the Górale in southern Poland, have quite a number of words borrowed from Hungarian (e.g. baca, gazda, juhas, hejnał) and Romanian as a result of historical contacts with Hungarian-dominated Slovakia and Wallachian herders who travelled north along the Carpathians.

Thieves' slang includes such words as kimać (to sleep) or majcher (knife) of Greek origin, considered then unknown to the outside world.

In addition, Turkish and Tatar have exerted influence upon the vocabulary of war, names of oriental costumes etc.  Russian borrowings began to make their way into Polish from the second half of the 19th century on.

Polish has also received an intensive number of English loanwords, particularly after World War II. Recent loanwords come primarily from the English language, mainly those that have Latin or Greek roots, for example  (computer),  (from 'corruption', but sense restricted to 'bribery') etc. Concatenation of parts of words (e.g. auto-moto), which is not native to Polish but common in English, for example, is also sometimes used.  When borrowing English words, Polish often changes their spelling. For example, Latin suffix '-tio' corresponds to -cja. To make the word plural, -cja becomes -cje. Examples of this include inauguracja (inauguration), dewastacja (devastation), recepcja (reception), konurbacja (conurbation) and konotacje (connotations). Also, the digraph qu becomes kw (kwadrant = quadrant; kworum = quorum).

Loanwords from Polish

The Polish language has influenced others. Particular influences appear in other Slavic languages and in German — due to their proximity and shared borders. Examples of loanwords include German Grenze (border), Dutch and Afrikaans grens from Polish granica; German Peitzker from Polish piskorz (weatherfish); German Zobel, French zibeline, Swedish sobel, and English sable from Polish soból; and ogonek ("little tail") — the word describing a diacritic hook-sign added below some letters in various alphabets. The common Germanic word quartz comes from the dialectical Old Polish kwardy. "Szmata," a Polish, Slovak and Ruthenian word for "mop" or "rag", became part of Yiddish. The Polish language exerted significant lexical influence upon Ukrainian, particularly in the fields of abstract and technical terminology; for example, the Ukrainian word  panstvo (country) is derived from Polish . The Polish influence on Ukrainian is particularly marked on western Ukrainian dialects in western Ukraine, which for centuries was under Polish cultural domination.

There is a substantial number of Polish words which officially became part of Yiddish, once the main language of European Jews. These include basic items, objects or terms such as a bread bun (Polish bułka, Yiddish בולקע bulke), a fishing rod (wędka, ווענטקע ventke), an oak (dąb, דעמב demb), a meadow (łąka, לאָנקע lonke), a moustache (wąsy, וואָנצעס vontses) and a bladder (pęcherz, פּענכער penkher).

Quite a few culinary loanwords exist in German and in other languages, some of which describe distinctive features of Polish cuisine. These include German and English Quark from twaróg (a kind of fresh cheese) and German Gurke, English gherkin from ogórek (cucumber). The word pierogi (Polish dumplings) has spread internationally, as well as pączki (Polish donuts) and kiełbasa (sausage, e.g. kolbaso in Esperanto). As far as pierogi concerned, the original Polish word is already in plural (sing. pieróg, plural pierogi; stem pierog-, plural ending -i; NB. o becomes ó in a closed syllable, like here in singular), yet it is commonly used with the English plural ending -s in Canada and United States of America, pierogis, thus making it a "double plural". A similar situation happened with the Polish loanword from English czipsy ("potato chips")—from English chips being already plural in the original (chip + -s), yet it has obtained the Polish plural ending -y.

It is believed that the English word spruce was derived from Prusy, the Polish name for the region of Prussia. It became spruce because in Polish, z Prus, sounded like "spruce" in English (transl. "from Prussia") and was a generic term for commodities brought to England by Hanseatic merchants and because the tree was believed to have come from Polish Ducal Prussia. However, it can be argued that the word is actually derived from the Old French term Pruce, meaning literally Prussia.

Literature

The Polish language started to be used in literature in the Late Middle Ages. Notable works include the Holy Cross Sermons (13th/14th century), Bogurodzica (15th century) and Master Polikarp's Dialog with Death (15th century). The most influential Renaissance-era literary figures in Poland were poet Jan Kochanowski (Laments), Mikołaj Rej and Piotr Skarga (The Lives of the Saints) who established poetic patterns that would become integral to the Polish literary language and laid foundations for the modern Polish grammar. During the Age of Enlightenment in Poland, Ignacy Krasicki, known as "the Prince of Poets", wrote the first Polish novel called The Adventures of Mr. Nicholas Wisdom as well as Fables and Parables. Another significant work form this period is The Manuscript Found in Saragossa written by Jan Potocki, a Polish nobleman, Egyptologist, linguist, and adventurer.

In the Romantic Era, the most celebrated national poets, referred to as the Three Bards, were Adam Mickiewicz (Pan Tadeusz and Dziady), Juliusz Słowacki (Balladyna) and Zygmunt Krasiński (The Undivine Comedy). Poet and dramatist Cyprian Norwid is regarded by some scholars as the "Fourth Bard". Important positivist writers include Bolesław Prus (The Doll, Pharaoh), Henryk Sienkiewicz (author of numerous historical novels the most internationally acclaimed of which is Quo Vadis), Maria Konopnicka (Rota), Eliza Orzeszkowa (Nad Niemnem), Adam Asnyk and Gabriela Zapolska (The Morality of Mrs. Dulska). The period known as Young Poland produced such renowned literary figures as Stanisław Wyspiański (The Wedding), Stefan Żeromski (Homeless People, The Spring to Come), Władysław Reymont (The Peasants) and Leopold Staff. The prominent interbellum period authors include Maria Dąbrowska (Nights and Days), Stanisław Ignacy Witkiewicz (Insatiability), Julian Tuwim, Bruno Schulz, Bolesław Leśmian, Witold Gombrowicz and Zuzanna Ginczanka.

Other notable writers and poets from Poland active during World War II and after are Zbigniew Herbert, Stanisław Lem, Zofia Nałkowska, Tadeusz Borowski, Sławomir Mrożek, Krzysztof Kamil Baczyński, Julia Hartwig, Marek Krajewski, Joanna Bator, Andrzej Sapkowski, Adam Zagajewski, Dorota Masłowska, Jerzy Pilch, Ryszard Kapuściński and Andrzej Stasiuk.

Five people writing in the Polish language have been awarded the Nobel Prize in Literature: Henryk Sienkiewicz (1905), Władysław Reymont (1924), Czesław Miłosz (1980), Wisława Szymborska (1996) and Olga Tokarczuk (2018).

Sample text 
Article 1 of the Universal Declaration of Human Rights in Polish:

Article 1 of the Universal Declaration of Human Rights in English:
All human beings are born free and equal in dignity and rights. They are endowed with reason and conscience and should act towards one another in a spirit of brotherhood.

See also
 Polonism (words of Polish origin)
 Adam Mickiewicz Institute
 A Translation Guide to 19th-Century Polish-Language Civil-Registration Documents
 BABEL Speech Corpus
 Holy Cross Sermons
 Lechitic languages
 University of Łódź School of Polish for Foreigners
 West Slavic languages
 West Slavs

Notes

References

Further reading

External links

 The Polish Language: A Cheatsheet for Beginners from Culture.pl
Podręczniki języka polskiego dla obcokrajowców 
 Basic Polish Phrases
 Basic Polish Phrases Audio Course
 Polish Pronunciation Audio and Grammar Charts
 King's College London: Polish Language Resources 
 University of Pittsburgh: Polish Language Website
 "A Touch of Polish", BBC
 A Concise Polish Grammar, by Ronald F. Feldstein (110-page 600-KB pdf)
 Oscar Swan's Electronic Polish-English, English-Polish dictionary
 English-Polish Online Dictionary
 Basic English-Polish Dictionary
 Big English-Polish Dictionary with example sentences from translation memories
 Polish Swadesh list of basic vocabulary words from Wiktionary's Swadesh-list appendix
 Learn Polish —List of Online Polish Courses
 Polish English wordlist, 600 terms
 A taste of the linguistic diversity of contemporary Poland from Culture.pl
 KELLY Project word list 9000 most useful words for learners of Polish
 Dictionaries24.com Online dictionary with English-Polish and Polish-English translations
 ‘Polszczyzna’ & the Revolutionary Feminine Suffix from Culture.pl
 Głagolicy, a way to write Polish with the Glagolitic script

 
Languages of Belarus
Languages of Lithuania
Languages of Poland
Languages of Ukraine
Lechitic languages
Subject–verb–object languages
West Slavic languages
Articles citing Nationalencyklopedin
Slavic languages written in Latin script